Jacob Iddriss Abdulai (born 24 February 1957) is a Ghanaian politician and member of the National Democratic Congress.  He is the member of parliament for Savelegu Constituency, Northern Region.

Early life and education 
Jacob was born on February 24, 1957, and hails from Savelegu. He holds a Survey School Cert, Diploma In Geodetic Engineering, Bsc. Geodetic Engineering and Msc. Road And Transportation Engineering

References 

People from Northern Ghana
Ghanaian MPs 2021–2025
1957 births
Living people
Ghanaian Muslims